Seymour: An Introduction is a 2014 American documentary film. Directed by Ethan Hawke, the film documents the career of Seymour Bernstein, a classical pianist who abandoned his rising career as a concert pianist at age 50 to retreat to a more modest, private life as a music educator and composer. The film was released on March 13, 2015, by IFC Films. As of July 2019, it has a 100% rating on the review aggregator website Rotten Tomatoes.

Release
The film debuted on August 30, 2014 at the Telluride Film Festival. At the 2014 Toronto International Film Festival, the film was second runner-up for the People's Choice Award for Best Documentary, behind Do I Sound Gay? and the winner, Beats of the Antonov. in August 2014, it was announced IFC Films had acquired United States distribution rights to the film. The film was released on March 13, 2015 in a limited release.

Reception
The film has received positive reviews. , it has a 100% rating on Rotten Tomatoes based on 66 reviews, with a weighted average of 7.76/10. The site's consensus reads: "Seymour Bernstein's genuineness shines so brightly in Seymour: An Introduction that viewers will forgive Ethan Hawke's reverent treatment". It also has a Metacritic score of 83 based on 27 critics, indicating "Universal acclaim".

See also

List of films with a 100% rating on Rotten Tomatoes

References

External links

2014 films
2014 documentary films
American documentary films
Documentary films about classical music and musicians
Films about pianos and pianists
Films directed by Ethan Hawke
2010s English-language films
2010s American films